The 1992 United States presidential election in Delaware took place on November 3, 1992, as part of the 1992 United States presidential election. Voters chose three representatives, or electors to the Electoral College, who voted for president and vice president.

Delaware was won by Governor Bill Clinton (D-Arkansas) with 43.52%% of the popular vote over incumbent President George H. W. Bush (R-Texas) with 35.33%. Businessman Ross Perot (I-Texas) finished in third, with 20.45% of the popular vote. Clinton ultimately won the national vote, defeating incumbent President Bush. Clinton comfortably won Delaware by a margin of 8.19%. This was the last election where Delaware was a swing state, with the margin within 3% of the national vote. In 1996, the state would shift to the left, becoming a Democratic stronghold.

As of the 2020 United States presidential election, this is the only election since 1948 in which Kent County did not support the overall winner.

Results

By county

See also
 United States presidential elections in Delaware

References

Delaware
1992
1992 Delaware elections